Araschnia burejana, the large map, is a butterfly of the family Nymphalidae. It is found in Tibet, China, the Amur and Ussuri regions of Russia, Korea and Japan.

It occurs in mixed forest up to 1,300 meters. Adults are on wing from May to June and from July to August in two generations per year.

The larvae feed on Urtica species.

Subspecies
Araschnia burejana burejana
Araschnia burejana chinensis Oberthür
Araschnia burejana leechi Oberthür
Araschnia burejana strigosa

References

Araschnia
Butterflies described in 1861
Butterflies of Asia
Taxa named by Otto Vasilievich Bremer